Dyscritella is an extinct genus of trepostome bryozoan that was highly successful in the late Triassic period, re-colonizing high latitudes in the northern hemisphere after the extinction of earlier bryozoan genera. Dyscritella was an "ecological opportunist" and widely distributed, found in every climatic belt.

References

Trepostomata
Prehistoric bryozoan genera